The Shadow of a Mine  is a 1929 German silent drama film directed by Phil Jutzi and starring Holmes Zimmermann and Sybille Schloß. Its original German title is Um's tägliche Brot (Our Daily Bread). It is also known as Hunger in Waldenburg.

The film was produced by the left-wing Volksfilmverband in partnership with Weltfilm and the Theater am Schiffbauerdamm. Using a docudrama format, the film highlights the hardships faced by Silesian coal miners in Waldenburg. It premiered at the Tauenzienpalast in Berlin on 16 March 1929.

The film was screened in Britain by the London Workers' Film Society in December 1929. This is now the only print of the film which survives.

Cast
 Holmes Zimmermann as Junger Weber 
 Sybille Schloß

References

Bibliography
 Bock, Hans-Michael & Bergfelder, Tim. The Concise CineGraph. Encyclopedia of German Cinema. Berghahn Books, 2009.
 Murray, Bruce Arthur. Film and the German Left in the Weimar Republic: From Caligari to Kuhle Wampe. University of Texas Press, 1990.

External links

1929 films
1929 drama films
German drama films
Films of the Weimar Republic
German silent feature films
Films directed by Phil Jutzi
Films about mining
Social realism in film
German black-and-white films
Silent drama films
1920s German films
1920s German-language films